Jean-Michel Henry (born 14 December 1963) is a French fencer. He won a gold, a silver and two bronze medals in the épée events at four different Olympic Games.

References

External links
 

1963 births
Living people
French male épée fencers
Olympic fencers of France
Fencers at the 1984 Summer Olympics
Fencers at the 1988 Summer Olympics
Fencers at the 1992 Summer Olympics
Fencers at the 1996 Summer Olympics
Olympic gold medalists for France
Olympic silver medalists for France
Olympic bronze medalists for France
Olympic medalists in fencing
Sportspeople from Marseille
Medalists at the 1984 Summer Olympics
Medalists at the 1988 Summer Olympics
Medalists at the 1992 Summer Olympics
Medalists at the 1996 Summer Olympics
20th-century French people